Events in the year 2021 in Belarus.

Incumbents
 President: Alexander Lukashenko
 Prime Minister: Roman Golovchenko

Events
Ongoing — COVID-19 pandemic in Belarus

11 March - Belarus reports their first case of the Lineage B.1.1.7 of SARS-CoV-2, which originated in the United Kingdom.

23 May - Ryanair Flight 4978

Scheduled events 
11 to 12 February - Allbelarusian People's Assembly

21 May to 6 June – Scheduled date for the 2021 IIHF World Championship, not to be co-hosted any more by Minsk, Belarus and Riga, Latvia.

7 to 13 June – Scheduled date for the 2021 World Modern Pentathlon Championships, to be moved from Minsk.

Deaths
 
12 January – Philaret, Orthodox prelate (born 1935).
June – Raïssa Koublitskaïa, agricultural worker and politician (b. 1928).

References

 
2020s in Belarus
Years of the 21st century in Belarus
Belarus
Belarus